Here We Are (translit. Hine Anachnu) is a 2020 Israeli-Italian drama film directed by . An official selection of the 2020 Cannes Film Festival, the film premiered as part of the 2020 Toronto International Film Festival. It was nominated for nine Ophir Awards including  Best Feature Film.

Cast
 
 Noam Imber

References

External links
 

2020 films
2020 drama films
Israeli drama films
2020s Hebrew-language films
Films set in Israel
Films shot in Israel
Films about autism
Films about father–son relationships